The 1965 Australian Touring Car Championship was a CAMS sanctioned motor racing title open to Group C Improved Production Touring Cars. It was contested over a single 40-lap race staged at Sandown Raceway in Melbourne, Victoria, Australia on 11 April 1965. It was the sixth Australian Touring Car Championship title to be awarded and the first to be contested by cars complying with Group C regulations.

The championship was won by Norm Beechey, driving a Ford Mustang. It was the first ATCC to be won with a V8-engined car and the first of five ATCC titles won by drivers of Ford Mustangs. It was Beechey's first of two Australian Touring Car Championship wins.

Race summary
The change in regulations from Appendix J to Group C had disadvantaged most heavily those driving Holdens, like Brian Muir, and Bob Jane's Jaguar, as the practice of overboring engines was effectively outlawed, making 4.1 litre Jaguars and 3.4-litre Holdens ineligible.

Jane qualified his new Ford Mustang on pole position, recording a time of 1:20.9. Beechey, also in a Mustang, had lapped in 1:20.8 in Friday practice, however transmission problems prevented him from setting a time in official qualifying and he started from the back of the grid. John Raeburn, driving a Ford Galaxie, and Jim McKeown, driving a Ford Cortina Lotus, completed the front tow. The reigning champion Ian Geoghegan lined up in eighth place on the grid.

Jane made the best of the start while Muir passed Raeburn for second place going into the second corner, but Raeburn was able to retake the position going up the back straight. Jane led by six seconds at the end of lap 1, while Beechey had made his way up to fifth place. He took second place halfway through lap 2 and began closing the gap to Jane, setting a new lap record of 1:20.8 in the process. He caught Jane on lap 7 and passed him at the first corner on lap 8. Brian Foley pitted on lap 11 with a broken brake line while Stan Starcevich retired on lap 14 with a broken differential. Jane retired on lap 23 when his engine overheated, which left Beechey leading by more than a lap over McKeown and Geoghegan. The two Cortina drivers swapped positions twice before the crankshaft on McKeown's car broke with six laps remaining, elevating Muir into third place. Muir then lost the position to Allan Moffat as he thought that Moffat was a lap down, but was able to retake the place before the end of the race.

Beechey took a comfortable victory, winning by a margin of one lap over Geoghegan and Muir. Moffat finished fourth ahead of Raeburn and Manton.

Results

Starting grid
The starting grid was decided by times set in official practice. Class leaders are indicated by bold text.

Race
Class winners are indicated by bold text.

Statistics
 Fastest race lap: Norm Beechey, 1:20.8
 Race distance: 40 laps, 124.12 km
 Average speed: 131.43 km/h

Notes

References

Australian Touring Car Championship seasons
Touring Car Championship
Motorsport at Sandown